Blue Oval News is an independent web site devoted to news, commentary, and speculation about Ford Motor Company.  It was started in 1998 by Warner Robert, who was involved in a high-profile lawsuit following his posting of information from Ford internal documents on the web.

In July 1999, Blue Oval News posted an article stating that the 1999 Mustang Cobra generates less power than advertised.  This article was based on Ford internal documents. Ford asked that this article be removed from circulation, a request refused by the publisher of Blue Oval News. Subsequently, in August 1999, Ford filed suit against Blue Oval News in U.S. Federal court claiming illegal dissemination of trade secrets and copyright infringement.  On 7 September 1999, Judge Nancy Edmunds ruled in favor of Blue Oval News on the basis of First Amendment rights to free speech.

External links
Blue Oval News

Ford Motor Company
American technology news websites
Internet properties established in 1998